Robert W. Iuliano is an American attorney and academic administrator serving as the 15th president of Gettysburg College. Previously, he worked as the senior vice president, general counsel, and deputy to the president at Harvard University.

Early life and education 
Iuliano was born in Watertown, Massachusetts. He attended Harvard University and earned a Juris Doctor from the University of Virginia School of Law.

Career 
Upon graduating law school, he held a judicial clerkship and worked as a federal prosecutor before joining the counsel's office at Harvard University. In addition to his administrative role at Harvard, Iuliano taught various seminar classes at the Harvard Graduate School of Education.

In January 2019, Gettysburg College announced that Iuliano would succeed Janet Morgan Riggs to become the college's 15th president. He assumed office in July 2019.

In response to the COVID-19 pandemic in Pennsylvania, Iuliano designated a one-week lockdown period for all students at Gettysburg College in September 2020. Iuliano also required all upperclassmen to return home for the fall semester, being the first American college to implement such a measure.

References

External links 
 Gettysburg College Biography

Heads of universities and colleges in the United States
Living people
Gettysburg College
Harvard University alumni
University of Virginia School of Law alumni
Year of birth missing (living people)
People from Watertown, Massachusetts